Isak Dybvik Määttä (born 19 September 2001) is a Norwegian footballer who plays as a midfielder for Dutch club FC Groningen.

Career
Hailing from Sula, Määttä joined Langevåg at the onset of his teenage years, then regional greats Aalesund in 2018 at the age of 17. The next year he made his league debut for Aalesund and won his first Norway youth caps.

On 28 July 2022, Määttä signed a four-year contract with Eredivisie club Groningen.

International career
Born in Norway, Määttä is of Finnish descent. He is a youth international for Norway, having represented the Norway U18s and U20s.

Career statistics

Club

Notes

References

2001 births
Living people
People from Møre og Romsdal
Norwegian footballers
Norway youth international footballers
Norwegian people of Finnish descent
Association football midfielders
Norwegian Fourth Division players
Norwegian Third Division players
Norwegian First Division players
Eliteserien players
Aalesunds FK players
FC Groningen players
Norwegian expatriate footballers
Expatriate footballers in the Netherlands
Norwegian expatriate sportspeople in the Netherlands